Imarex ASA also known as the Imarex Group is a Norwegian company that operates a number of services related to shipping management including the futures exchange International Maritime Exchange (Imarex), the Norwegian Futures and Options Clearing House (NOS) and the commodity exchange Fish Pool. The group was created in 2006 when Imarex and NOS merged, under the name Imarex NOS. In 2007 the group changed its name to Imarex ASA. The two primary owners are Frontline (15%) and DnB NOR (14%). The group also provides brokerage services within carbon emission trade and energy trade.

References

External links
Imarex ASA - Official Site

Financial services companies of Norway
Business services companies of Norway
Business services companies established in 2006
Companies based in Oslo
Companies formerly listed on the Oslo Stock Exchange
Norwegian companies established in 2006